Standard Bulgarian vehicle registration plates display black glyphs (alphanumeric characters) on a white background, together with – on the left-hand side of the plate – a blue vertical "EU strip" showing the flag of Europe (or, for older-registered cars, the flag of Bulgaria) and, below it, the country code for Bulgaria: BG.

The characters displayed in the main field of the plate are: 
a one- or two-letter province code 
four numerals 
a final two-letter code, known as the "series". 
The format is thus XX NNNN YY, where XX (or X) is the province code, NNNN is the serial number, and YY is the series. Since 1992, only glyphs that are common to both the Cyrillic and the Latin alphabets have been used on Bulgarian plates.

Format

Letters
Only 12 letters are used. In Bulgarian order, these are: А, В, Е, К, М, Н, О, Р, С, Т, У, Х. One of these letters, i.e. У (which is the Bulgarian letter for the sound u) does not coincide fully with the Latin capital letter Y. However for the purpose of registration it is accepted as being the same (the Bulgarian letter У does not originate directly from the Greek or Latin Y). All of these are used as part of the province codes (i.e. on the left). Only nine letters are used in the series (i.e. on the right), of which "А" is the only vowel. The three that are not used in the series, (all vowels) are Е, reserved exclusively for trailers and caravans (e.g. СА 1234 ЕЕ), О and У. Since 2022, the letter E is used in the series of cars in Sofia, (e.g. CB 1234 TE).

Numbers
Number plates with a single letter in the series, i.e. "X(X) NNNN Y", appear mainly on mopeds and motorcycles, but can rarely be seen on some older vehicles that have failed to undergo the obligatory re-registration. The format "X(X) AAAAAA" may be used in vanity plates, where "A" represents either letters or numbers chosen by the owner (a name for example). The price of such a custom plate is BGN 7,000 (approx. €3,500), so these are rare.

Other
Not counting the "Е" series, which is reserved for trailers, nor the vanity plates with no series letters, there is a total of 810,000 possible combinations for each province. This total ran out in Sofia ("С") in late 2005, and was replaced by "СА" in early 2006; In 2014, "CB" began to be used.

Note that the number "0" is written normally, while the letter "O" is egg-shaped.

History

Until 1958 

Black letters on a white background, in the format: X(x) NN-NN.

1958–1986 

State vehicles retained the black on white format, while private vehicles were given black plates with white lettering. The format was X(x)- NNNN. after reaching 9999 a letter was set in front of the 4 numbers X(x)-Y-NNNN. 
In the early 80's, after all the combinations with the letter "C" were exhausted in Sofia, a new format was introduced in the capital beginning with "A", namely AYY-NNNN. Plates with the combinations AAB-NNNN and ABC-NNNN were issued before the standard was changed once again in 1986.

1986–1992 
 
A new issue of plates is introduced with the standard format of "X(X) NNNN Y(Y)". Yellow for private plates, white for state-owned vehicles, with previous-style plates no longer valid. These new plates used ISO 7591 standard font & size and had reflective surfaces.
"E" was designated as the series letter for trailers, and "Ч" for private freight and private mass transport vehicles (Ч: частен, private)

1992–present 

Since 1992, the letter license plate code used letters common to both the Latin and Cyrillic alphabets, irrespective of whether they have the same phonetic value or not: А, В, Е, К, М, Н, О, Р, С, Т, У, Х, the same as today. A similar system is used in Greece, Russia, Belarus, Bosnia and Herzegovina, and Ukraine. Regions are as per ISO 3166-2:BG.  The new 1992 issue of plates used a white background, in the format "X(X) NNNN Y". All former yellow background plates became invalid. In 1993, The hyphens/stops between letter and number blocks were also phased out and also became invalid in 1993. During the mid-1990s, the "X NNNN Y" combinations began to run out in many provinces (as there were only 90,000 possible combinations), and so a second letter was added to the series. Between 2000 and 2008, the left-hand blue band Bulgaria flag was phased in, eventually becoming a legal requirement on 1 July 2006. These plates were all in the "X(X) NNNN YY" format, but the shape of the letters was changed to the current standard – namely, the letters were made more "square" and heavier-set than previously. These plates all began with the series "AA", thereby repeating some combinations that had already existed before, albeit without the EU strip. On 1 January 2007 Bulgaria (BG) and Romania (RO) joined the European Union, and the standardised Europlate was introduced soon after.

Special types

Temporary registration of vehicles 

In use are also three other types of plates in format of nnn X nnn:
 Н plate for unregistered vehicles and export (Н: , new)
 М plate, same as H, started 2017 after the Н series was exhausted
 В plate for car dealers (В: , temporary)
These three types use a white background with black text and a red vertical strip on the right side. The year of expiration is inscribed on the bottom half of the red strip, and the month of expiration is sometimes placed on the top half, either as a sticker or written with marker.

Military and civil protection vehicles 

Since 2006, all military vehicles' plates are subject to change with the new ones: the letters "BA" (for Bulgarian Army, formerly "В" in red on a white plate) and 6 digits — the form is "BA NNN NNN".
The same form is adopted for the new license plates of the Civil Protection Service of Bulgaria, beginning with "CP" (for Civil Protection, formerly "ГЗ") followed by 5 digits — "CP NN NNN". On the left side of both kinds of plates there is a blue EU-standard vertical strip.

Foreigner vehicles 

Cars belonging to foreigners and imported into Bulgaria for a limited period of time are light blue with white characters, starting with "ХХ", followed by four (semantically meaningless) digits and two small digits denoting the expiry year. From 2019 "XH" is used after "XX".

Diplomatic plates 

Diplomatic and consular car number plates are similar to ordinary ones, but are recognizably different in their color: white symbols on a red background. Plates starting with "C" indicate diplomatic status, "CC" indicate consular status, while "CT" is used for cars belonging to other staff of diplomatic representations. Additionally, the first two digits of the numeric group represent the country of the diplomatic or consular mission to which the vehicle belongs. Two smaller digits in the lower right corner denote the expiry year of the plate.

Electric vehicles 
Starting from 17 November 2022 electric vehicles receive plates with dark green font color and beginning with "EA" (electric automobile) instead of the usual province code for cars and "EM" (electric motorcycle) for motorcycles.

Repeater plates 
Repeater plates to be affixed to bicycle racks have red lettering on a white background. They were introduced in 2016. Several repeating plates can be issued in Bulgaria for the same vehicle.

Provincial codes

After the requirement that all number plate codes had to be compatible with both the Cyrillic and Latin alphabets came into force:
 The provinces that already had compatible codes retained them: e.g. Varna "B", Ruse "P", Dobrich "TX".
 Each main city's province has its own area code, except the capital, Sofia, which has a code for the capital area, i.e. Sofia and the directly surrounding towns and villages (C, CA, CB), and 1 for Sofia Province, i.e. the further country, towns, and villages surrounding the capital (CO)
 Most other major cities took on the remaining single-letter codes that were unused: e.g. Burgas "A", Blagoevgrad "E" (a significant exception to this is Plovdiv's "PB")
 The rest adopted two-letter codes that simply included random letters from their names, mostly from Cyrillic, some from Latin, and a few from a combination of the two.

Since 2019 due to change of regulation, it is not compulsory to change registration plate if one buy already registered vehicle, regardless the region it is registered. So the provincial codes show only the province of first registration of the vehicle in Bulgaria.

Diplomatic plate codes

See also
 Driving licence in Bulgaria
 Bulgarian identity card
 Bulgarian passport

References

External links
 

Road transport in Bulgaria
Bulgaria
Bulgaria transport-related lists
 Registration plates